Springiersbach Abbey is a former Augustinian (Canons Regular) monastery, and currently a Carmelite monastery in Bengel municipality, in the Eifel region of Rhineland-Palatinate, Germany.

It was founded in 1102 by Bruno of Lauffen, archbishop of Trier under the patronage of count palatine Siegfried of Ballenstedt. The first abbot was Richard I (provost from 1118, abbot from 1129, died 1158). In 1107, the monastery became independent of the archbishopric, allowing the monks to elect their abbots freely. Entrance into the monastery was reserved for nobility, who would typically bequeath their lands to the monastery on entry. The Augustinian convent was dissolved in the Napoleonic era.

The Carmelite convent was established in 1922.

References 

 Karl-Josef Gilles und Erwin Schaaf: Springiersbach. Von der Augustiner-Chorherrenabtei zum Karmelitenkloster 1102–2002.  (Schriftenreihe Ortschroniken des Trierer Landes, Band 36), Trier 2002, .

External links 

 http://www.karmeliten.de/klosterspringiersbach.html 

Monasteries in Rhineland-Palatinate
Buildings and structures in Bernkastel-Wittlich